Thorntonhall railway station is a railway station in the village of Thorntonhall, South Lanarkshire, Scotland.

History 
In 1866, the Busby Railway was opened to exploit the Giffnock sandstone quarries and the Busby textile industry. Two years later, in 1868, the railway was extended to East Kilbride via Thorntonhall.
The station in Thorntonhall was originally named 'Eaglesham Road'. At the beginning, the station was only open to mineral traffic in 1867, and later extended for passengers to use it in September 1868. Glasgow South Side, at Gushetfaulds, was a 30-minute journey from Thorntonhall.

Services 

Some additional trains call at weekday peak periods.

References

Sources

External links 
Video footage and history of the station

Railway stations in South Lanarkshire
SPT railway stations
Railway stations served by ScotRail
Railway stations in Great Britain opened in 1868
Former Caledonian Railway stations
1868 establishments in Scotland